Okhor-Shibir (Okhor Sheber) is a rural locality (an ulus) in Tunkinsky District, Republic of Buryatia, Russia. The population was 547 as of 2010. There are 5 streets.

Geography 
Okhor-Shibir is located 24 km east of Kyren (the district's administrative centre) by road. Zhemchug is the nearest rural locality.

References 

Rural localities in Tunkinsky District